Tilemachos Karabas (born 5 April 2001) is a Greek professional footballer who plays as a midfielder for Super League 2 club Panathinaikos B.

References

2001 births
Living people
Greek footballers
Super League Greece 2 players
Levadiakos F.C. players
Panathinaikos F.C. B players
Association football midfielders
21st-century Greek people